The Hexapod-Telescope (HPT) is a telescope located at Cerro Armazones Observatory in northern Chile.  The  Ritchey-Chrétien reflecting telescope is notable for the design of the telescope mount.  Instead of the typical mounting where the telescope moves on two rotating axes, the mirror end of the telescope is supported by six extensible struts, an arrangement known as a Stewart platform.  This configuration allows the telescope to move in all six spatial degrees of freedom and also provides strong structural integrity.  As a result, the ratio of bearing pressure and its own weight is very high.  Furthermore, the six-leg structure allows for a very precise positioning and repeatability.  The disadvantage of the system is that controlling and aiming a hexapod-mounted telescope is much more complex than with conventional telescope mounts.

The mounting was designed by engineers of the company Vertex, in collaboration with astronomers of the Astronomy Institute of the Ruhr University Bochum (AIRUB) in Germany.  Led by Prof. Rolf Chini, the HPT was thoroughly tested at AIRUB. In 2006, it was moved to its new location on Cerro Armazones Observatory in the Atacama Desert in Chile. AIRUB, in collaboration with the Astronomy Department of the Catholic University of the North (UCN), is developing an observatory there.  A new control building was built next to the HPT on the summit of Cerro Murphy, a subsidiary peak of Cerro Armazones.

Together with the Landessternwarte Heidelberg-Königstuhl, AIRUB developed the Bochum Echelle Spectrograph for the Optical (BESO) for the HPT.  It is a copy of the Fiber-fed Extended Range Optical Spectrograph (FEROS) operated by the European Southern Observatory.

See also
 Array for Microwave Background Anisotropy
 Telescope mount

References

Further reading
 Theodor Schmidt-Kaler: The Hexapod Telescope: A New Way to Very Large Telescopes. In: Progress in Telescope and Instrumentation Technologies, ESO Conference and Workshop Proceedings, ESO Conference on Progress in Telescope and Instrumentation Technologies, ESO, Garching, 27–30 April 1992, Garching: European Southern Observatory (ESO), 1992, edited by Marie-Helene Ulrich, p. 117

External links
 AIRUB - Observatorio Cerro Armazones at Ruhr-Universität Bochum
 Observatorío Cerro Armazones (OCA) at Universidád Católica del Norte
 Hexapod for ALMA Radio Telescopes' secondary mirror

Telescopes